BWI Airport Station is an intermodal passenger station in Linthicum, Maryland near Baltimore–Washington International Airport (BWI). It is served by Amtrak Northeast Corridor intercity trains, MARC Penn Line regional rail trains, and several local bus lines.

Located just over a mile from the airport's terminal, the station was the first intercity rail station in the United States built to service an airport. A free shuttle bus runs between the station and the airport terminal at all hours.

Although Penn Station is the Baltimore area's main intercity station, BWI Airport is a major station in its own right. It is Amtrak's sixth-busiest station in the Mid-Atlantic region (behind New York Penn, Washington, Philadelphia, Baltimore Penn and Albany-Rensselaer), the third-busiest in the Baltimore-Washington corridor, and the 12th busiest nationwide.

History

First proposed in 1964 by Charles Adler, a Baltimore-based inventor of traffic and aircraft safety devices, the station was dedicated on October 23, 1980coincidentally, mere hours after Adler's deathand opened for Amtrak intercity and Conrail (now MARC) commuter trains three days later.

The station's building houses a ticketing desk, waiting room, and a concessions area. The adjacent parking garage is used by commuters who ride the train to work in Baltimore or Washington, and also contains the bus stop for shuttles to the BWI terminal. The garage was built in the late 1990s to replace a smaller surface lot. It contains 3,200 parking spaces and typically does not fill to capacity. The Carolinian served the station between 1991 and 2004.

Platform renovations
The existing structures were replaced with new precast concrete segments, and new signs, lights, shelters, railing, canopies, and benches were installed.

Expansion

In 2010, $9.4 million was allocated for design and engineering of a new station building and fourth track, which was then expected to cost $80–100 million. MDOT requested $300 million in federal funds for the project in 2011, but the request was denied. The Federal Railroad Administration issued a Finding Of No Significant Impact—a major step in the environmental review process—in February 2016, clearing the way for final design and construction to begin after funding was obtained. The project was then expected to cost $600 million and include  of fourth track.

On August 27, 2018, the MTA began a $4.7 million project to rebuild and enlarge the station. A temporary station building was used during construction. The new station opened in October 2019, with a ribbon-cutting ceremony held in December. The renovation did not modify the Amtrak-owned footbridge, which has water leakage and cleanliness issues, nor add WiFi service in the MTA-owned waiting area. In response, the MTA said that it does not offer WiFi at any of its stations, but is working with Amtrak to ensure that the footbridge gets needed repairs.

Station layout and services

Northeast Corridor
BWI Rail Station is located on Amtrak's Northeast Corridor, a  rail line connecting Washington, D.C., Philadelphia, New York, and Boston. Amtrak's Northeast Regional, Acela Express, Vermonter, and Palmetto, as well as the MARC Penn Line commuter rail service, stop at the station. Amtrak long distance trains, as well as some Northeast Regional and Acela Express trains, bypass the station.

The station appears in Amtrak timetables as BWI Thurgood Marshall Airport. Unlike most major stations along the Northeast Corridor, it is not possible to check bags to and from BWI; it is the busiest Amtrak station without checked baggage service.

Public transit services

 Airport shuttle bus: The station is indirectly connected to MTA's Baltimore Light Rail, for which there is a stop (BWI Marshall Airport) station at the airport terminal.
 MTA bus route 17: Connects the station to Arundel Mills (to the south) and the Patapsco Baltimore Light Rail station (to the north), with stops at the airport terminal and the BWI Business District station.
 MTA commuter bus route 201: Offers service between Gaithersburg and BWI Airport.
 Regional Transportation Agency of Central Maryland Route 501/Silver: Service to BWI Airport, Arundel Mills, Howard County and The Mall in Columbia.
 UMBC Transit
 BayRunner Shuttle, a private shuttle connecting east to the Eastern Shore area of Maryland and connecting shuttle to Cumberland.

Pedestrian and bicycle access
 BWI Trail: A walk/bike trail completely encircles the airport grounds parallel to the Airport Loop, and runs adjacent to the station.
 An elevated walkway connects the station (at the second floor of the southbound platform's stairwell) with office buildings on Corporate Center Drive, including the Maryland Department of Transportation headquarters.

References

External links

Baltimore Airport Amtrak (TrainWeb)
MARC Station (TrainWeb)

Railway stations in Anne Arundel County, Maryland
Amtrak stations in Maryland
Linthicum, Maryland
MARC Train stations
Penn Line
Stations on the Northeast Corridor
Rail Station
Airport railway stations in the United States
Railway stations in the United States opened in 1980